Ivo Karlović was the defending champion, but chose not to participate that year.

First-seeded David Nalbandian won in the final 6–2, 5–7, 6–3, against Robin Söderling.

Seeds

Draw

Finals

Top half

Bottom half

External links
 Draw
 Qualifying draw

Singles